Keijo "Kexi" Heinäharju (born 2 February 1955) is a Finnish former professional darts player.

Darts career
Heinäharju won the 1981 Finland Open, beating fellow Finn Risto Nurmela in the final. He first qualified for the BDO World Darts Championship in 1984, defeating Danny Inglis in the first round before losing to Ceri Morgan in round two. He would make three further appearances in the World Championships in 1987, 1989 and 1991 but lost in the first round each time to Paul Lim, Steve Gittins and Eric Bristow.

World Championship Results

BDO
 1984: Second Round (lost to Ceri Morgan 1–4) (sets) 
 1987: First Round (lost to Paul Lim 1–3)
 1989: First Round (lost to Steve Gittins 0–3)
 1991: First Round (lost to Eric Bristow 0–3)

External links
Kexi Heinäharju's Profile and stats on Darts Database

Finnish darts players
Living people
British Darts Organisation players
1955 births
Sportspeople from Jyväskylä